Rao Gari Illu is a 1988 Indian Telugu-language drama film, produced by Y. Surendra under Annapurna Studios and S. S. Creations banner and directed by Tharani Rao. It stars Akkineni Nageswara Rao, Jayasudha and Revathi, while Nagarjuna has given cameo appearance and music was composed by Chakravarthy. The film is loosely based on the 1965 American film The Sound of Music.

Plot 

Anand Rao, a public prosecutor leads a happy life with his wife Jaya and five children. One day, Jaya dies in a road accident. There onwards, Anand Rao becomes a drunkard and his house is completely disintegrated. Anand Rao's friend SP Raghava Rao sends his cousin Shanti as governess to take care of the children, in her acquaintance, they become as a straight arrow and develop a lot of affection towards Shanti. Parallelly, Anand Rao and Raghava Rao always have a rivalry with Tata Rao, an underworld mafia broker; they want to arrest him red-handed and are just waiting for an opportunity. Meanwhile, Anand Rao's elder daughter Lata is a big fan of actor Nagarjuna; one day her classmates trap her but to her fortune protected by Nagarjuna only. After some time, Anand Rao and Raghava Rao decides to marry Shanti marriage, but the children are not able to leave her, so they ask Anand Rao to marry her, but he refuses and Shanti leaves the house. Eventually, Tata Rao kidnaps the children. Finally, Anand Rao saves his children, gets back Shanti and marries her.

Cast 

Akkineni Nageswara Rao as Anand Rao
Jayasudha as Jaya
Revathi as Shanthi
Nagarjuna as himself (guest)
Murali Mohan as SP Raghava Rao
Nutan Prasad as Tata Rao
Brahmanandam as Tufan Baba
Suthi Velu as Kalakullu Ludhavadanulu
Bhimeswara Rao as an Officer
Surya as Sivaji
Uttej as Raghu's Friend
Srikanth as Raghu
Indira as Lata
Master Minraj as Ramu
Baby Kalyani as Bujji
Baby Raasi as Chitti

Soundtrack 

The film songs composed by Chakravarthy. Lyrics written by Veturi. Music released on Annapoorna Music Company.

Reception 
Giddaluri Gopalrao writing his review for Zamin Ryot on 17 June 1988, praised the director Tharani Rao for handling a sensitive storyline with ease.

References

External links 

1988 drama films
1980s Telugu-language films
1988 films
Films scored by K. Chakravarthy
Indian drama films
Indian remakes of American films